Viscount Craigavon, of Stormont in the County of Down, is a title in the Peerage of the United Kingdom. It was created in 1927 for Sir James Craig, 1st Baronet, the Prime Minister of Northern Ireland. He had already been created a baronet, 'of Craigavon, in the County of Down' in 1918. , the titles are held by his grandson, the third Viscount, who succeeded his father in 1974. He is one of the ninety elected hereditary peers that remain in the House of Lords after the passing of the House of Lords Act 1999, and sits as a crossbencher.

The family seat was Craigavon House at Sydenham in the County Down portion of Belfast.

Viscounts Craigavon (1927)
James Craig, 1st Viscount Craigavon (1871–1940)
James Craig, 2nd Viscount Craigavon (1906–1974)
Janric Fraser Craig, 3rd Viscount Craigavon (born 1944)

There is no heir to the titles.

Arms

Notes

Citations

References
Kidd, Charles & Williamson, David (editors). Debrett's Peerage and Baronetage (1990 edition). New York: St Martin's Press, 1990, 

Viscountcies in the Peerage of the United Kingdom
Noble titles created in 1927
Noble titles created for UK MPs